Pokémon: The Johto Journeys is the third season of Pokémon, and the third season of Pokémon: The Original Series, known in Japan as Pocket Monsters: Episode Gold & Silver (ポケットモンスター 金銀編, Poketto Monsutā: Kin Gin Hen). It originally aired in Japan from October 14, 1999, to July 27, 2000, on TV Tokyo, in South Korea from October 25, 2000, to March 14, 2001, on Seoul Broadcasting System, and in the United States from October 14, 2000, to August 11, 2001, on The WB (Kids' WB).

This season, the narrator of the Pokémon anime will follow the continue adventures of the ten-year-old Pokémon trainer Ash Ketchum and his electric mouse partner Pikachu as they collect Gym Badges in the fictional Johto region so they can compete in the Johto League competition.

The episodes were directed by Masamitsu Hidaka and produced by the animation studio OLM.

In 2000, during the show's run in the United States, it was ranked as the number 1 program among boys 2–11 years old.



Episode list

Music
The Japanese opening song is "OK!" by Rika Matsumoto as Satoshi for 41 episodes. The ending songs are "Meowth's Party" (ニャースのパーティ, Nyasu No Pāti) by Inuko Inuyama as Nyasu, Megumi Hayashibara as Musashi,and Shin'ichiro Miki as Kojiru, for 25 episodes, Rikako Aikawa (who voices some Japanese Pokémon too) and Chorus performed "Exciting Pokémon Relay" (ポケモンはらはらリレー, Pokémon Hara Hara Rirē) for 10 episodes, and "Exciting² Pokémon Relay (Hard Version)" (ポケモンはらはら²リレー むずかし版, Pokémon Hara Hara² Rirē Muzukashi Ban) for 5 episodes, "Takeshi's Paradise (タケシのパラダイス, Takeshi no Paradaisu) by Yūji Ueda as Takeshi for one episode, and the English opening song is "Pokémon Johto" by the musical group called Johto. Its short version serves as the end credit song. The ending songs at the end of each episode are "You & Me & Pokémon" for 9 episodes, and "Pikachu (I Choose You)" for 8 episodes by Élan Rivera and the musical group called Johto, "Song of Jigglypuff" by Rachael Lillis as Jigglypuff and the musical group called Johto for 8 episodes, "All We Wanna Do" by Élan Rivera and the musical group called Johto for 8 episodes, and "Two Perfect Girls" by Eric Stuart as Brock for 8 episodes from Pokémon Karaokémon.

Home media
In the United States, the season was released in 13 volumes on VHS and DVD by Viz Video and Pioneer Entertainment. The last two episodes: "The Psychic Sidekicks!" and "The Fortune Hunters" were not shown on these sets.

Viz Media and Warner Home Video released Pokémon: The Johto Journeys – The Complete Collection on DVD in the United States on November 10, 2015.

References

External links 
 
  at TV Tokyo 
  at Pokémon JP official website 

1999 Japanese television seasons
2000 Japanese television seasons
Season03